Thomas van der Wilt (1659–1733) was an 18th-century painter from the Northern Netherlands.

Biography
Van der Wilt was born in Piershil.  Houbraken mentioned him as one of the pupils of Jan Verkolje. He became a master portrait painter in Delft, where he died.

According to the RKD he became the teacher of Jacob Campo Weyerman. He is known for portraits and historical allegories.

References

Thomas van der Wilt on Artnet

1659 births
1733 deaths
17th-century Dutch painters
18th-century Dutch painters
18th-century Dutch male artists
Dutch male painters
Dutch portrait painters
People from Korendijk